The 1980 Trans-Am Series was the fifteenth running of the Sports Car Club of America's premier series. After several years of recovery from the decline of demand for muscle cars in the early seventies and the 1973 Oil Crisis, Trans Am evolved into a support series for the IMSA GT Championship, using vehicles that were also used in IMSA GT races. This would set the standard for the series thereafter, and this standard would be applied to the SCCA's World Challenge series many years later. Almost all of the races ran for approximately one hundred miles. Besides Watkins Glen, the only exception was Trois-Rivieres (~75 miles).

Schedule

Results

Championship

Drivers

John Bauer – 127 points
Greg Pickett – 76 points
Monte Sheldon – 72.5 points
Roy Woods – 71 points
Mark Pielsticker – 62 points

References

Trans-Am Series
Trans-Am
Trans-Am